Schinia lucens, the leadplant flower moth or false indigo flower moth, is a moth of the family Noctuidae. The species was first described by Herbert Knowles Morrison in 1875. It is found in the central and western United States.

The wingspan is about 25–28 mm. There is one generation per year.

The larvae feed on Amorpha species.

References

Schinia
Moths of North America
Moths described in 1875